Kelvyn Park is located at 4438 W. Wrightwood Avenue in the Hermosa neighborhood of North Side, Chicago, Illinois. It is part of the Chicago Park District.

Kelvyn Park High School is nearly adjacent to the park in Hermosa.

See also

References 

Parks in Chicago
North Side, Chicago
Urban public parks